Spathiurus is an extinct genus of prehistoric ray-finned fish that lived during the Cenomanian in the Sannine Formation of Lebanon.

Description
Spathiurus was designated as a member of the Ionoscopidae family in 2020 as it shows the diagnostic features of the group, making it the first member of the family to be known from the late Cretaceous as well as the Middle East. It is believed to be a sister taxon to Ionoscopus petrarojae, the both are more derived than 'Ionoscopus' cyprinoides, which probably belongs in a different distinct genus. The species Amphilaphurus major is currently believed synonymous with Spathiurus dorsalis.

See also

 Prehistoric fish
 List of prehistoric bony fish

References

External links
 

Ionoscopiformes
Late Cretaceous fish
Late Cretaceous fish of Asia
Prehistoric ray-finned fish genera